Debra A. Kemp (March 7, 1957 – February 8, 2015) was an American author.

She wrote historical fiction and drew inspiration for her House of Pendragon series from the Arthurian legends. She originally studied nursing and earned her degree from Indiana University in 1981. She died in 2015.

Family
Kemp lived near Indianapolis with her husband. They had two grown children.

Literary career
Kemp published her first Arthurian novel The Firebrand in 2003. It is set after the Battle of Camlann, and features King Arthur's fictional daughter Lin and her early life as a slave in Mordred's household.

Works

The House of Pendragon series
The Firebrand (2003)
The Recruit (2007)

Awards
 EPPIE 2005 – Finalist
 Dream Realm Awards – Finalist
 Top 10 Finisher – Preditors & Editors

References

External links

1957 births
American fantasy writers
American women novelists
Novelists from Indiana
Writers of modern Arthurian fiction
American historical novelists
People from Highland, Lake County, Indiana
21st-century American novelists
Women science fiction and fantasy writers
21st-century American women writers
2015 deaths
20th-century American novelists
20th-century American women writers
Women historical novelists